The four-man bobsleigh competition at the 2018 Winter Olympics was held on 24 and 25 February at the Alpensia Sliding Centre near Pyeongchang, South Korea.

Qualification

The top three countries in the 2017–18 Bobsleigh season (including the World Cup, Europe races and Americas Cup) were awarded the maximum three sleds. The next six countries were awarded two sleds each. The remaining nine sleds were awarded to nine different countries, with Australia being awarded an Oceania continental quota and South Korea being awarded a slot as host nation.

Results
The first two runs were held on 24 February and the last two runs on 25 February 2018.

References

Bobsleigh at the 2018 Winter Olympics
Men's bobsleigh at the 2018 Winter Olympics
Men's events at the 2018 Winter Olympics